The Jorgensen's General Store is a historic site in Grant-Valkaria, Florida. It is located at 5390 U.S. 1. On June 25, 1999, it was added to the U.S. National Register of Historic Places.

References and external links

Brevard County listings at National Register of Historic Places
Grant General Store at Florida's Office of Cultural and Historical Programs

Buildings and structures in Brevard County, Florida
National Register of Historic Places in Brevard County, Florida
General stores in the United States